The fifth season of the American political comedy television series Veep debuted on April 24, 2016, on HBO. The season has 10 episodes, each with an approximate runtime of 28 minutes. It was the first season with David Mandel as the showrunner and centers the lead-up to the resolution of the tied presidential election between President Selina Meyer and Senator Bill O'Brien. Veep was renewed for a season six shortly after the first episode debuted.

Selina hires a seasoned political advisor, Bob Bradley, to help her campaign contest the vote tally in Nevada. While Jonah runs a congressional campaign for an open New Hampshire seat, Mike and his wife prepare to adopt a Chinese baby, Selina begins dating a high-profile banker and Catherine reveals a new romantic partner. Her running mate Tom James plots to exploit a Congressional loophole that will secure his election as President. Selina causes an economic crisis when she accidentally tweets about her opponent and blames it on Chinese hackers. After a congressional vote fails to produce a winner, the Senate vote ends in tie broken by Vice President Doyle, who selects O'Brien's running mate, Senator Laura Montez.

The season received critical acclaim. It garnered nominations from the WGA Awards, TCA Awards, and the Saturn Awards, among others. Julia Louis-Dreyfus won her fifth consecutive Primetime Emmy Award for Outstanding Lead Actress in a Comedy Series.

Plot summary
President Meyer continues to govern while she and her team try to leverage the election results in Nevada as their path to victory. A new Secret Service agent, Marjorie, is hired to Selina's detail. Meanwhile, Mike and his wife, Wendy, begin the process of adopting an infant girl from China. Amy rejoins Selina's team to manage the campaign operation in Nevada and after Dan is fired from his lobbying job, Amy hires Dan to help her in Nevada, where Richard is also hired into a leadership role. Selina taps veteran political operative Bob Bradley, "The Eagle", to oversee the Nevada strategy. While in Carson City, Amy and Dan have a flirtatious moment that ends with Dan sleeping with Amy's sister. Amy meets election observer Buddy Calhoun in Nevada and they begin dating.

The stock market crashes after the Election Day tie, so Selina puts Tom James in the unsavory role of economy czar. She meets and begins a relationship with banking magnate Charlie Baird. One day Selina accidentally tweets an insult about Senator O'Brien meant only for Charlie and then blames the Tweet on Chinese hackers. She decides to levy sanctions against China on the advice of Bob Bradley. The team eventually realizes Bob is experiencing some mental confusion and he's removed from his role.  

Missing ballots are recovered from Washoe County and Selina brings in her friend Karen Collins to delay the state's certification deadline. However, after the ballots are counted O'Brien is officially declared the winner of Nevada's electoral college votes, as well as the winner of the popular vote. The election will now be voted on by Congress. Jonah's uncle Jeff Kane helps Jonah run for an open New Hampshire congressional seat that will be pivotal for the upcoming vote. His campaign is successful when his opponent runs afoul of the NRA. 

Selina's mother, referred to as Mee-Maw, is hospitalized after a stroke. Selina takes her off life support and, though she has largely negative feelings towards her mother, receives a significant bump in favorability polls due to the perception that she is grieving. 

At the height of the economic crisis, Selina has to decide between two banks to bail out, one of which belongs to Charlie. He breaks up with her when she decides to bailout the other bank. Amy is put in charge of investigating Politico's claims that someone on Selina's core staff called the President a cunt. The investigation reveals that it was every staffer except Gary. Catherine comes out as a lesbian and reveals that she and Marjorie have fallen in love. The relationship developed while Catherine filmed Selina in the White House for her thesis documentary project (shown in "Kissing Your Sister").

Selina meets with the President of China to negotiate a deal to lift the sanctions. In a positive turn, the talks go well and he promises he is open to a path to independence for Tibet.

Tom James is caught attempting to convince congresspeople to abstain from the upcoming election vote in a maneuver to secure his Presidency. After he and Selina have a screaming argument at the White House holiday party, they end up having sex.

Two months after Election Day, the House of Representatives hold the historic vote to break the election tie. Both candidates fail to secure at least 26 votes, sending the decision over to the Senate. This results in yet another tie, broken by sitting Vice President Andrew Doyle. He votes for President O'Brien's running mate Senator Laura Montez. Montez is sworn in at the inauguration and to Selina's further dismay, gets credit for negotiating independence for Tibet.

Cast and characters

Main 
 Julia Louis-Dreyfus as Selina Meyer
 Anna Chlumsky as Amy Brookheimer
 Tony Hale as Gary Walsh
 Reid Scott as Dan Egan
 Timothy Simons as Jonah Ryan
 Matt Walsh as Mike McLintock
 Sufe Bradshaw as Sue Wilson
 Kevin Dunn as Ben Cafferty
 Gary Cole as Kent Davison
 Sam Richardson as Richard Splett

Recurring
 Dan Bakkedahl as Congressman Roger Furlong
 Lennon Parham as Karen Collins, a lawyer and Selina's close friend
 Clea DuVall as Marjorie Palmiotti, a member of Selina's Secret Service detail and later, Catherine's girlfriend
 Nelson Franklin as Will, Senator Furlong's top aide
 Mary Catherine Garrison as Sophie Brookheimer, Amy's sister
 Peter Grosz as Sidney Purcell
 Brian Huskey as Leon West
 Hugh Laurie as Senator Tom James, Selina's running mate and at times, her adversary
 Brad Leland as Senator Bill O'Brien, Selina's opponent in the Presidential Election
 Tzi Ma as Lu Chi-Jang, the President of China
 Peter MacNicol as Jeff Kane, a key political operative in New Hampshire and Jonah's uncle.
 Martin Mull as Bob Bradley, "The Eagle," a veteran political operative hired to help Selina with her campaign
 Kathy Najimy as Wendy Keegan, Mike's wife and a fashion journalist
 David Pasquesi as Andrew Meyer, Selina's ex-husband
 Sally Phillips as Minna Häkkinen, the former Prime Minister of Finland and the head of the IMF
 Phil Reeves as Andrew Doyle, the sitting Vice President 
 Andrea Savage as Senator Laura Montez
 John Slattery as Charlie Baird, a top banking executive and Selina's love interest
 Sarah Sutherland as Catherine Meyer, Selina's daughter

Episodes

Production 
Season five was the first overseen by David Mandel, who took over after then showrunner and series creator Armando Iannucci stepped down. Mandel made the decision to deliver Selina to an election loss because it would foster better comedic material. He and lead actress Julia Louis-Dreyfus worked together previously when Mandel was a Seinfeld writer.

The first episode premiered on HBO on April 24, 2016. Episodes were released weekly thereafter. Veep was renewed for a sixth season the day after the premiere.

Reception 
Season five of Veep received critical acclaim. It holds a 94% on review aggregator Rotten Tomatoes. Ben Travers rated the season an A in IndieWire and described it: "Well, so far Season 5 feels as though Iannucci built the ship and is letting Mandel take it out on the water. It’s running just fine, even if it may not get any exciting additions comparable to what’s come before." Allison Herman, top critic for The Ringer, noted that amid the change over to Mandel, "Veep’s edge has stayed razor-sharp...To borrow a stale political term, the show has doubled down on its strengths: Louis-Dreyfus’s slowly crumbling rictus and the methodical puncturing of the illusion that “government” and “authority” are in any way related." Jen Chaney reviewed season 5 in the New York Times: "The election may be deadlocked, but already, Season 5 looks like a winner."

Caroline Framke of Vox praised Julia Louis-Dreyfus's performance in season five as "a terrifying, disgusting, completely beautiful thing to behold." Sarah Marshall of The Week wrote that the season effectively depicts the personalities drawn to politic: "Veep is a show about the pursuit of power, but it's also about the broken people who pursue it. In the process, it's become one of the most disturbingly insightful character-driven narratives of our day."

The season garnered nominations for the Primetime Emmy Awards, SAG Awards, TCA Awards, and the Writers Guild of America Awards. Among other wins, the series received a Primetime Emmy Award for Outstanding Comedy Series and Louis-Dreyfus won her fifth Primetime Emmy Award for Outstanding Lead Actress in a Comedy Series for the role.

References

External links 
 
 

2016 American television seasons
Veep (TV series)